Ognisko Pińsk was a Polish football team, located in Pińsk, Poland  (now Belarus), on the historic territory of Kresy Wschodnie (Polish Eastern Borderlands).

The club was founded in an unknown year and most of its history remains unknown either. In early summer of 1939 Ognisko won championships of the Polesie Voivodeship, but it lost qualifiers to the Polish Football League, Pinsk's side was beat both by Śmigły Wilno and WKS Grodno. The club ceased to exist after the Soviet invasion of Poland (1939).

Sources

  A June 22, 1939 newspaper article with history of Ognisko Pinsk.

Defunct football clubs in Belarus
Association football clubs disestablished in 1939
Defunct football clubs in former Polish territories
Western Belorussia (1918–1939)